Trachyneta is a genus of African sheet weavers that was first described by Å. Holm in 1968.

Species
 it contains only two species.
Trachyneta extensa Holm, 1968 – Congo
Trachyneta jocquei Merrett, 2004 – Malawi

See also
 List of Linyphiidae species (Q–Z)

References

Araneomorphae genera
Linyphiidae
Spiders of Africa